Jiří Moravec (born 13 February 1980 in Nymburk) is a Czech professional ice hockey defenceman who is currently a free agent.

Moravec played in the Czech Extraliga for HC Bílí Tygři Liberec and BK Mladá Boleslav as well as the Czech 1.liga for HC Benátky nad Jizerou and Motor České Budějovice.

Career statistics

References

External links

1980 births
Living people
BK Mladá Boleslav players
Czech ice hockey defencemen
Ferencvárosi TC (ice hockey) players
HC Benátky nad Jizerou players
HC Bílí Tygři Liberec players
Motor České Budějovice players
MsHK Žilina players
People from Nymburk
Sportspeople from Liberec
Czech expatriate ice hockey players in Slovakia
Czech expatriate sportspeople in Hungary
Expatriate ice hockey players in Hungary